Telenipara is a census town in Barrackpore II CD Block in Barrackpore subdivision of North 24 Parganas district in the state of West Bengal, India. It is close to Kolkata and also a part of Kolkata Urban Agglomeration.

Geography

Location
Babanpur, Jafarpur, Mohanpur and Telenipara form a cluster of census towns around Barrackpore.

96% of the population of Barrackpore subdivision (partly presented in the map alongside) live in urban areas. In 2011, it had a density of population of 10,967 per km2. The subdivision has 16 municipalities and 24 census towns.

For most of the cities/ towns information regarding density of population is available in the Infobox. Population data is not available for neighbourhoods. It is available for the entire Municipal area and thereafter ward-wise.

All places marked on the map are linked in the full-screen map.

Police station
Khardaha police station under Barrackpore Police Commissionerate has jurisdiction over Khardaha Municipal area and Barrackpore II CD Block.

Post Office
Sewli Teilinipara has a delivery sub post office, with PIN 700121 in the North Presidency Division of North 24 Parganas district in Calcutta region. Other post offices with the same PIN are Nilganj Bazaar, Beraberia and Suryapur.

Demographics
As per the 2011 Census of India, Telenipara had a total population of 17,781, of which 9,124 (51%) were males and 8,657 (49%) were females. Population below 6 years was 1,714. The total number of literates in Telenipara was 13,813 (85.97% of the population over 6 years).

Infrastructure
As per the District Census Handbook 2011, Telenipara covered an area of 7.8086 km2. Amongst the medical facilities it had were 5 medicine shops, Amongst the educational facilities it had were 11 primary schools, 5 middle schools, 5 secondary schools and 4 senior secondary schools. The nearest degree college was available 4 km away at Barrackpore.

Transport
Telenipara is located on the Barrackpore-Barasat Road (part of State Highway 2).

Bus

Private Bus
 81 Barasat - Barrackpore Fishery Gate
 81/1 Barasat - Rajchandrapur

WBTC Bus
 C29 Barasat - Barrackpore Court
 E32 Nilganj - Howrah Station
 S11 Nilganj - Esplanade
 S34B Barasat State University - Barrackpore Court
 AC10 Nilganj - Howrah Station

Train
The nearest railway stations are Barasat Junction railway station on the Sealdah-Bangaon line and Barrackpore railway station on the Sealdah-Ranaghat line.

Education
P.N. Das College at Palta is located nearby.

References

Cities and towns in North 24 Parganas district